The Oshan X5 is a 5-seater compact crossover produced by Changan Automobile under the Oshan brand (known as Oushan in some markets).

Overview

The X5 debuted on the 2020 July Chengdu Motor Show and was launched on the Chinese auto market in November 2020 with prices ranging from 69,900 yuan to 102,900 yuan. 

The Oshan X5 was branded under ushan, Changan's affordable premium brand, a sub-brand that focuses on building passenger vehicles which was separated from the Oushang brand and also referred to as Oushan. Oushan/Oshan was known for producing compact MPVs and crossovers, with the COS1° being the first product of the brand. 

The Oshan X5 is based on the Changan MPA platform, and it is powered by the 1.5-liter Blue Whale NE turbo engine producing 180 hp and 221 lb-ft (300 Nm) of torque mated to a seven-speed dual-clutch transmission.

References

External links
Official website 

Oshan X5
Crossover sport utility vehicles
Cars of China
Cars introduced in 2020